Maxim Alekseyevich Stupin (born 11 May 2000) is a Russian swimmer. He competed in the 2020 Summer Olympics.

References

2000 births
Living people
Swimmers from Moscow
Swimmers at the 2020 Summer Olympics
Russian male swimmers
Olympic swimmers of Russia
Universiade medalists in swimming
Universiade bronze medalists for Russia
Medalists at the 2019 Summer Universiade